Baldwin is an unincorporated community in Gilmer County, West Virginia, United States.

References

Unincorporated communities in Gilmer County, West Virginia
Unincorporated communities in West Virginia